The American Snuff Company, formerly Conwood Sales Company LLC, is a US tobacco manufacturing company that makes a variety of smokeless tobacco products, including dipping tobacco or moist snuff, chewing tobacco in the forms of loose-leaf, plug, and twist, and dry snuff.

Originally established as "Conwood LLC" in 1900 in New York City, the company began manufacturing smokeless tobacco products in 1904 in Tennessee. From 1986 to 2006, Conwood was owned by the Pritzker family of Chicago. The company is currently a subsidiary of Reynolds American, after being acquired in mid-2006 for $3.5 billion in cash. When Reynolds American acquired Conwood, Reynolds subsidiary Lane Limited was merged into it. The name "American Snuff Company" was assumed in 2010.

Nowadays the company has three facilities, two in Tennessee (Memphis and Clarksville) and the other in Winston-Salem, North Carolina. As of 2017, American Snuff generated nearly 7% of Reynolds American's annual revenue. The current President of American Snuff Company is Chris Gemmell.

Products and brands 
Brands commercialised include:

Dipping tobacco
 Cougar
 Grizzly 
 Kodiak

Chewing tobacco

 Levi Garrett
 Taylor's Pride
 H.B. Scott's
 Morgan's
 Peachey
 Hawken
 Cannonball Plug
 Mammoth Cave Twist
 Moore's Red Leaf
 Cumberland Twist
 Warren County Twist

Dry snuff

 Garrett
 Honest
 Tube Rose
 Peach
 Dental

Discontinued

Moist Snuff
 Wintermint

Chewing tobacco
Conwood

Dry Snuff
Big Wheel
Big Bear Sweet Snuff
Rainbow

References

External links
 

Manufacturing companies based in Memphis, Tennessee
Tobacco companies of the United States
R. J. Reynolds Tobacco Company